Lazare Venot (16 August 1902 – 12 March 1977) was a French racing cyclist. He rode in the 1931 Tour de France.

References

1902 births
1977 deaths
French male cyclists